The Italian Catholic diocese of Caltagirone is situated in the east of Sicily. It is a suffragan of the archdiocese of Catania.  Since 20 March 2012 the bishop is Calogero Peri.

The diocese consists of fifteen towns in the province of Catania: Caltagirone, Castel di Judica, Grammichele, Mazzarrone, San Michele di Ganzaria, Raddusa, Ramacca, Mirabella Imbaccari, Scordia, Militello in Val di Catania, Palagonia, Mineo, Licodia Eubea, San Cono and Vizzini. The main town, where is St. Julian's cathedral church, is Caltagirone.
The territory is subdivided into 57 parish churches.

History

The diocese was created on 12 September 1817 with the papal bull Romanus Pontifex of Pope Pius VII, and the permission of the King of Naples which was registered on 20 February 1818. Originally it was a suffragan of the diocese of Monreale, but from 20 May 1844 it entered in the ecclesiastic province of Siracusa.  From 2 December 2000, with the Pope John Paul II's papal bull, Ad maiori consulendum, the diocese became a suffragan of archdiocese of Catania. On 20 March 2010, the 15th bishop of Caltagirone, Calogero Peri, O.F.M.Cap., was the first bishop to be consecrated in St. Julian's cathedral of Caltagirone.

Bishops
 Gaetano Maria Giuseppe Benedetto Placido Vincenzo Trigona e Parisi (21 December 1818 – 15 April 1833)
 Benedetto Denti, O.S.B. (15 March 1833 – 3 August 1853)
 Giuseppe Maria Maniscalco, O.F.M. (17 April 1854 – 10 April 1855)
 Luigi Natoli (15 March 1858 – 22 February 1867)
 Vacant (1867–1872)
 Antonio Morana (23 February 1872 – 18 August 1879)
 Giovanni Battista Bongiorno † (22 September 1879 – 14 March 1887)
 Saverio Gerbino (14 March 1887 – 16 March 1898)
 Damaso Pio De Bono (28 November 1898 – 17 December 1925)
 Giovanni Bargiggia (14 March 1927 – 6 July 1937)
 Pietro Capizzi (12 August 1937 – 11 November 1960)
 Francesco Fasola, O.SS.G.C.N. (11 November 1960 – 25 June 1963)
 Carmelo Canzonieri (30 July 1963 – 8 January 1983)
 Vittorio Luigi Mondello (30 July 1983 – 28 July 1990)
 Vincenzo Manzella (30 April  1991 – 17 September 2009)
 Calogero Peri, O.F.M.Cap., from 30 January 2010

See also
 Caltagirone
 Luigi Natoli (bishop)

Notes

External links
  Home page

Caltagirone
Religious organizations established in 1816
Caltagirone
Diocese
1816 establishments in the Kingdom of the Two Sicilies
1816 establishments in Italy